Year 1202 (MCCII) was a common year starting on Tuesday (link will display the full calendar) of the Julian calendar.

Events 
 By place 

 Fourth Crusade 
 April – May – The bulk of the Crusader army gathers at Venice, although with far smaller numbers than expected: about 12,000 men (4–5,000 knights and 8,000 soldiers) instead of 33,500 men. Several contingents decide to make their own way to the Holy Land by different routes. A Crusader fleet, sailing from Flanders, carrying supplies for the Counts Baldwin IX and his brother Henry of Flanders, winters in Marseilles, but is slowed by adverse weather. Later it sails on to the Middle East, along with other contingents from southern France.                                                                                                       
 Summer – The Crusader army, encamped on the island of San Niccolo di Lido, between the Venetian Lagoon and the Adriatic Sea, is threatened by Doge Enrico Dandolo to keep them interned, unless full payment is made as agreed (see 1201). As the Crusaders wait on the Lido for men to arrive, they also use up food supplies that Venice has agreed to supply. Dandolo faces a financial catastrophe, who has halted its commerce for a year's time, to prepare the expedition. The Crusader lords can offer Dandolo only 51,000 silver marks.
 September 8 – Enrico Dandolo takes the cross and agrees to lead a Venetian force, which, in an outburst of Crusading enthusiasm, reaches some 21,000 men – the largest contingent of the Fourth Crusade. He proclaims the debts will be wiped, if the Crusaders take the 'rebel' Dalmatian city of Zadar, who has pledged its loyalty to Emeric, king of Hungary and Croatia. The Zadar proposal causes disquiet in the Crusader ranks – but italso  upset Pope Innocent III who threatens to excommunicate those who attack Zadar. 
 September – Prince Alexios Angelos sends representatives from Verona to the Crusader leaders in Venice, he promises to submit the Greek Orthodox Church to papal obedience and to provide the Crusade with 200,000 silver marks, together with provisions for a year. Alexios also will contribute 10,000 mounted soldiers to the expedition. In return he wants the Crusade to overthrow his uncle, the Byzantine emperor Alexios III (Angelos).
 November 10–24 – Siege of Zadar: The Crusaders under Boniface of Montferrat besiege and conquer Zadar in Dalmatia. Despite letters from Innocent III forbidding such an action, and threatening excommunication. The leading citizens of Zadar hang banners of crosses along the outer walls, professing their Catholic faith. Nevertheless, the Crusaders breach and sack the city, killing many.
 Winter – Innocent III excommunicates the Crusader army, along with the Venetians, who winter at Zadar. Many Crusaders, including some senior men, either abandon the Fourth Crusade or make their own way to the Holy Land. However, the majority remain in Zadar, where the army receives some welcomed reinforcements. During the winter, negotiations continue with Alexios Angelos.

 Europe 
 Spring – King Philip II (Augustus) summons King John (Lackland) to Paris to answer his charges against the Lusignans. On April 28, failing to attend Philip's court, John is declared to be a 'rebel' and to have forfeited the areas of Aquitaine, Poitou and Anjou. Philip tries to mediate the political problems between John and the Lusignans (who are charged with treason) but this is ignored by John. The lands are given to Arthur of Brittany. Philip supports Arthur's claim to the English throne and betrothes his 4-year-old daughter Marie.
 August 1 – Battle of Mirebeau: Arthur of Brittany, supported by the Lusignans, lays siege to Mirebeau Castle trapping Eleanor of Aquitaine inside. John launches a rescue mission to free his mother, and with a mercenary army defeats the Breton-Lusignan forces. Arthur is captured by William de Braose and is handed over to John who imprisons him in the Château de Falaise in Normandy. Many other important knights are captured and shipped to England (where John treats them badly and keeps them as prisoners in dungeons).
 July 27 – Battle of Basian: Seljuk forces (some 150,000 men) under Suleiman II of Rûm advance toward the Georgian border and are met by a 65,000-strong army led by King David Soslan, husband of Queen Tamar of Georgia at Basian. The Georgians assail the enemy's camp and in a pitched battle, the Seljuk forces are overwhelmed and defeated. The loss of the sultan's banner (while Suleiman himself is wounded), results in panic within the Seljuk ranks. The victory at Basian secures the Georgian preeminence in the region.
 The Livonian Brothers of the Sword is founded by Bishop Albert of Riga, this to support the Livonian Crusade against the inhabitants in Medieval Livonia.
 Danish forces make a Crusade to Finland, which is led by Anders Sunesen, archbishop of Lund, and his brother.
 The Almohad fleet expels the Banu Ghaniya from the Balearic Islands.

 Middle East 
 May 20 – An earthquake shakes the Levant from Egypt to northern Iraq, causing severe damage in Palestine, Lebanon and western Syria, including the fortifications of the Crusader cities of Acre, Jaffa and Tyre. 

 By topic 

 Religion 
 Spring – Pope Innocent III reasserts his right to evaluate and crown the Holy Roman Emperor, in a letter to Berthold V, duke of Zähringen.
 Rueda Abbey is founded by Cistercians at Sástago, in the Kingdom of Aragon (modern Spain).

Births 
 Alfonso of Molina, prince of León and Castile (d. 1272)
 Boniface II (the Giant), king of Thessalonica (d. 1253)
 Enni, Japanese Buddhist monk and teacher (d. 1280)
 Kunigunde of Hohenstaufen, queen of Bohemia (d. 1248)
 Margaret of Constantinople, countess of Flanders (d. 1280)
 Matilda II of Boulogne, queen consort of Portugal (d. 1259)
 Mōri Suemitsu, Japanese nobleman and samurai (d. 1247)
 Qin Jiushao, Chinese mathematician and writer (d. 1261) 
 Shi Tianze, Chinese general and prime minister (d. 1275)

Deaths 
 January 9 – Birger Brosa, Swedish nobleman and knight
 January 12 – Fujiwara no Tashi, Japanese empress (b. 1140)
 March 9 – Sverre Sigurdsson (or Sverrir), king of Norway 
 March 13 – Mieszko III (the Old), duke of Poland (b. 1126)
 March 30 – Joachim of Fiore, Italian theologian (b. 1135)
 April 5 – Geoffrey III (or IV), French nobleman and knight
 May 7 – Hamelin de Warenne, Norman nobleman (b. 1130)
 May 10 – Mu'adzam Shah of Kedah, Malaysian sultan 
 June 16 – Aymer (or Adhemar), count of Angoulême 
 August 8 – Simon I, German nobleman and knight
 August 10 – Ulrich II, German nobleman and knight
 November 12 – Canute VI, king of Denmark (b. 1163)
 December 3 – Conrad of Querfurt, German bishop
 Alain de Lille, French theologian and writer (b. 1128)
 Albert of Chiatina, Italian archpriest and saint (b. 1135)
 André de Chauvigny (or Andrew), French knight (b. 1150)
 Bernard of Fézensaguet, French nobleman (b. 1155)
 Blondel de Nesle (or Jean I), French trouvère (b. 1155)
 Eugenius of Palermo, Italian admiral and poet (b. 1130)
 Geoffroy de Donjon, French Grand Master and knight
 Hammad al-Harrani, Ayyubid scholar, poet and traveler
 Jakuren, Japanese Buddhist priest and poet (b. 1139)
 Kojijū, Japanese noblewoman and waka poet (b. 1121)
 Minamoto no Yoshishige, Japanese samurai (b. 1135)
 Roger de Beaumont, English chancellor and bishop
 William of the White Hands, French cardinal (b. 1135)

References